Antoine Redin (4 September 1934 - 27 August 2012) was a French footballer and football manager.

He played for FC Nancy, Toulouse and AS Nancy.

He coached AS Nancy and Bastia.

References

External links

1934 births
2012 deaths
French footballers
French football managers
FC Nancy players
AS Nancy Lorraine players
Ligue 1 players
Ligue 2 players
AS Nancy Lorraine managers
SC Bastia managers
Association football defenders
Sportspeople from Gironde
Footballers from Nouvelle-Aquitaine